Lycurgus (c. 390 – 324 BC) was a statesman and logographer in Ancient Greece. In the aftermath of the Athenian defeat at the Battle of Chaeronea in 338 BC, he became the leading figure in Athenian politics, taking control of Athenian finances and pushing through a range of measures which drastically increased Athens' revenues. This money was used to expand the navy, improve the city's fortifications, develop the temples and religious ceremonies, and to build up a hefty reserve. He also encouraged the restoration of traditional values and prosecuted those who fell short of his expectations of civic behaviour. Because of his leading role, the period from 338 to 324 BC is often known in modern scholarship as the "Age of Lycurgus."

He was one of the ten Attic orators included in the "Alexandrian Canon" compiled by Aristophanes of Byzantium and Aristarchus of Samothrace in the third century BC. His only surviving speech is the Against Leocrates.

He should not be confused with the quasi-mythological Spartan lawgiver of the same name.

Life
Lycurgus was born before 384 BC, probably around 390 BC. His father was Lycophron son of Lycurgus, who belonged to the noble family of the Eteobutadae. His mother's name is partially preserved on a funerary inscription as -ne, daughter of -kleos. He belonged to the deme Butadae, which was in the tribe of Oeneis.

In his early life he devoted himself to the study of philosophy in the school of Plato, but afterwards became one of the disciples of Isocrates, and entered upon public life at a comparatively early age. He was appointed manager of the public revenue for a four-year term from 336 to 332 BC and proved highly successful. Because multiple terms in this role were banned, at the end of his tenure he picked a series of substitutes who held the office on his behalf and followed his direction for the next two terms, from 332 to down to 324 BC. The conscientiousness with which he discharged the duties of this office enabled him to raise the public revenue to the sum of 1200 talents.

In 335 BC after Thebes revolted against Alexander the Great and was sacked, Alexander demanded that the Athenians hand over Lycurgus, Demosthenes, and other opponents of the Macedonians, but the Athenians refused.

He was further entrusted with the superintendence of the city and the keeping of public discipline; and the severity with which he watched over the conduct of the citizens became almost proverbial.

His integrity was so great, that even private persons deposited with him large sums of money, which they wished to be kept in safety. He was also the author of several legislative enactments, of which he enforced the strictest observance. One of his laws forbade women to ride in chariots at the celebration of the mysteries; and when his own wife transgressed this law, she was fined; another ordained that bronze statues should be erected to Aeschylus, Sophocles, and Euripides, that copies of their tragedies should be made and preserved in the public archives.

The Lives of the Ten Orators erroneously ascribed to Plutarch are full of anecdotes and characteristic features of Lycurgus. He often appeared as a successful accuser in the Athenian courts, but he himself was as often accused by others, though he always, and even in the last days of his life, succeeded in silencing his enemies.

Thus, we know that he was attacked by Philinus, Dinarchus, Aristogeiton, Menesaechmus, and others. 

He died while holding the office of director of the Theatre of Dionysus, in 325/4 BC, shortly before the Harpalus affair.

At his death he left behind three sons who were severely persecuted by Menesaechmus and Thrasycles, but were defended by Hypereides and Democles. 

In 307/6 BC, the orator Stratocles ordered a bronze statue to be erected to him in the Ceramicus, and that he and his eldest son should be entertained in the prytaneum at the public expense.

Family

Lycurgus claimed descent from the mythical Athenian king Erechtheus. He was a member of the branch of the Eteoboutadae clan (genos) that supplied the priests of Poseidon Erechtheus. He is probably ultimately descended from Lycurgus son of Aristolaides who led the Pedieis ("people of the plains") in the conflicts leading up to the establishment of Pisistratus' tyranny. His grandfather, also called Lycurgus, was priest of Poseidon in the late fifth-century, supported the introduction of the cult of Isis in Athens and was murdered by the Thirty Tyrants in 404 BC. Nothing about his father's life is recorded.

Lycurgus married Callisto, daughter of Habron from the deme of Bate, who belonged to a wealthy family, part of the other branch of the Eteoboutiad clan, which provided the priestess of Athena Polias. Her brother, Callias, was treasurer of the military fund in 338/7 BC.

Lycurgus had three sons: 
 Lycophron, whose descendants are attested in important offices and priesthoods down to at least the end of the first century BC.
 Habron (ca. 350-305 BC), who succeeded his father as priest of Poseidon, and, after the fall of Demetrius of Phalerum and the restoration of democracy, he served as head of administration in 307/6 and treasurer of the military fund in 306/5 BC. He died childless.
 Lycurgus, who also died childless.

The funerary mound of the family in the Kerameikos was discovered in the 1980s.

Writings
The Lives of the Ten Orators mentions that fifteen orations of Lycurgus were extant when it was written, probably in the late first century BC, but we know the titles of at least twenty. All of these are lost, or preserved only in fragments, except for Against Leocrates, which was delivered in 330 BC. 

As a result, our knowledge of his style as an orator is very incomplete. Dionysius and other ancient critics draw particular attention to the ethical tendency of his orations, but they censure the harshness of his metaphors, the inaccuracy in the arrangement of his subject, and his frequent digressions. His style was said to be noble and grand, but neither elegant nor pleasing. His works seem to have been commented upon by Didymus of Alexandria. 

Theon mentions two declamations, Encomium of Helen and Deploration of Eurybatus, as the works of Lycurgus; but this Lycurgus, if the name be correct, must be a different personage from the Attic orator. 

Against Leocrates was first printed by Aldus Manutius in his edition of the Attic orators in 1508.

Reference

Editions

Bibliography

External links
Lycurgus, Against Leocrates (both Greek text and English translation at the Perseus Project)

390s BC births
324 BC deaths
Attic orators
4th-century BC Athenians